Frank Rigney (April 9, 1936 – June 29, 2010) was an offensive tackle for the Winnipeg Blue Bombers in the Canadian Football League.

College
Rigney played college ball with another Blue Bomber great, quarterback Ken Ploen at the University of Iowa.

CFL
Frank Rigney was an outstanding offensive tackle for Winnipeg. During his 10-year stint from 1958 to 1967, Winnipeg won the Grey Cup four times, in 1958, 1959, 1961, and 1962. Winnipeg also participated and lost in 1965, the so-called Wind Bowl. "The first year we got a tie clasp from the city. The second year that we won, we did get a ring, the one and only one we got.  The next two that we won, I can't remember what we got.  I think we got a watch,"  Rigney stated. Rigney retired from football due to back injuries. Through ten seasons he only missed five games.

Post-football
After football, he had a thirty-five year career in the insurance business and did media work for twenty years.  He was the colour commentator for both the CBC and CTV football broadcasts, plus covered other sports such as the 1980 Winter Olympics in Lake Placid, New York and the 1984 Winter Olympics in Sarajevo, Yugoslavia.

In 2003, Rigney received a titanium shoulder replacement. In 2004 due to an ulcer in his right foot he had a toe amputated. Later, Rigney's right leg was amputated below his knee after an infection from an operation turned to gangrene. At the time of his death, Rigney resided in West Vancouver.

Photos
Pass blocking in the 1965 Grey Cup Game against Hamilton

References
Judy Owen. Legends - Game was cruel to lineman Rigney, Bomber Game Day/Winnipeg Free Press/Friday, June 2, 2006

1936 births
2010 deaths
People from West Vancouver
Players of Canadian football from British Columbia
American players of Canadian football
Canadian Football Hall of Fame inductees
Canadian Football League announcers
Canadian football offensive linemen
Iowa Hawkeyes football players
Winnipeg Blue Bombers players